Jan-Paul Frederik Daniel Saeijs (born 20 June 1978) is a Dutch former professional footballer who played as a defender.

Career
Born in The Hague, Saeijs made his debut in professional football for ADO Den Haag in the 1998–99 season.

In January 2009, he joined Southampton on loan, with an option of making the deal permanent if Southampton were still in the Championship at the end of the 2008–09 season. He made his debut in a 1–0 victory over Barnsley on 10 January.

He scored his first two Southampton goals against Watford, a header and a 30-yard free kick.

On 10 June 2010 Saeijs signed with Eredivisie newcomer, De Graafschap. He signed a contract for 2 years.
Saeijs announced his retirement from professional football in May 2012 and signed with Topklasse side HBS Craeyenhout from his home city The Hague. He retired from football altogether in June 2015.

References

External links

1978 births
Living people
Footballers from The Hague
Dutch footballers
Dutch expatriate footballers
Association football defenders
De Graafschap players
ADO Den Haag players
Roda JC Kerkrade players
Southampton F.C. players
HBS Craeyenhout players
Eredivisie players
Eerste Divisie players
Derde Divisie players
English Football League players
Expatriate footballers in England
Dutch expatriate sportspeople in England